= Napham =

Napham is a unique dish in Bodo cuisine. It is made by pounding smoke dried fish with taro stems and/or leaves and the mixture is allowed to ferment in a sealed bamboo cylinder. Thereafter, aged napham could be fried or used as is. Napham is similar to chutney and is made from tiny fermented fish. These are pounded with red chillies, mustard oil, spices and salt, and preserved for use accompanying rice and dal dishes later in the year.
